Neoasterolepisma is a genus of primitive insects belonging to the family Lepismatidae. Many species live with ants.

Species

Neoasterolepisma angustothoracicum (Grassi & Rovelli, 1889)
Neoasterolepisma balcanicum (Stach, 1922)
Neoasterolepisma balearicum Molero-Baltanas, Bach de Roca & Gaju-Ricart, 1998 (1997)
Neoasterolepisma basilewskyi (Wygodzinsky, 1955)
Neoasterolepisma bicolorellum (Silvestri, 1949)
Neoasterolepisma braunsi (Escherich, 1903)
Neoasterolepisma caecum Molero-Baltanas, Bach de Roca & Gaju-Ricart, 1999
Neoasterolepisma crassipes (Escherich, 1905)
Neoasterolepisma curtiseta Mendes, 1988
Neoasterolepisma delamarei Mendes, 1988
Neoasterolepisma delator Molero-Baltanas, Bach de Roca & Gaju-Ricart, 1996
Neoasterolepisma deserticola (Kaplin, 1980)
Neoasterolepisma evansi (Silvestri, 1923)
Neoasterolepisma foreli (Moniez, 1894)
Neoasterolepisma gauthieri (Wygodzinsky, 1941)
Neoasterolepisma hespericum Molero-Baltanas, Bach de Roca & Gaju-Ricart, 1996
Neoasterolepisma imitans (Mendes, 1980)
Neoasterolepisma inexpectatum Molero-Baltanas, Bach de Roca & Gaju-Ricart, 1993
Neoasterolepisma insulare Mendes, 1993
Neoasterolepisma lusitanum (Wygodzinsky, 1941)
Neoasterolepisma macropenne Mendes, 1985
Neoasterolepisma magnicauda (Silvestri, 1908)
Neoasterolepisma myrmecobium (Silvestri, 1908)
Neoasterolepisma necrophila Mendes, 1992
Neoasterolepisma nigericum (Mendes, 1981)
Neoasterolepisma pallidum Molero-Baltanas, Gaju-Ricart & Bach de Roca, 1995
Neoasterolepisma palmonii (Wygodzinsky, 1942)
Neoasterolepisma paucisetosum (Stach, 1935)
Neoasterolepisma pauperculum (Silvestri, 1907)
Neoasterolepisma pelagodromae Mendes, 1988
Neoasterolepisma priesneri (Stach, 1946)
Neoasterolepisma psammophila (Kaplin, 1980)
Neoasterolepisma santschii (Silvestri, 1908)
Neoasterolepisma scorpius Mendes, 1993
Neoasterolepisma soerenseni (Silvestri, 1908)
Neoasterolepisma spectabiloides Mendes, 1988
Neoasterolepisma stachi (Wygodzinsky, 1941)
Neoasterolepisma vanharteni Mendes, 1998
Neoasterolepisma vulcana Mendes, Bach de Roca & Gaju-Ricart, 1992 (1993)
Neoasterolepisma wasmanni (Moniez, 1894)

References

Lepismatidae
Zygentoma
Insect genera
Insects of Europe